Puerto Juárez is a district in the Benito Juárez municipality, in the Mexican state of Quintana Roo. It is in the north-east of the Yucatán Peninsula, on the shore of the Caribbean Sea, 2 km (1.25 mi) north from the center of Cancún.  Puerto Juárez was the primary location of the original population of the area before the founding of the city of Cancún, and was a separate location from 1960 until 1990 when it was abolished as such and incorporated as one of Cancún's districts.

Ferry
Gran Puerto is the ferry port located in Puerto Juárez. It serves as a primary way to access Isla Mujeres, an island around 10 km (6 mi) from Puerto Juárez, from Cancún. The regular ferry service runs twice an hour on the high-speed ferry Ultramar. The ferry terminal has two lines for Ultramar passengers, restrooms, a parking garage, convenience store, and ticketing area.

In the 1950s, there was a proposal from Cuba to run a ferry from Puerto Juárez to Pinar del Río Province, Cuba, as part of the Pan-American Highway. The distance would only be a little more than that of the Havana–Key West ferry, with which it would have been linked by highway. The Cuban Revolution of 1959 ended the project.

References

Populated places in Quintana Roo